Emin Fahrettin Özdilek was a military officer and politician. He served as acting Prime Minister of Turkey in 1961.

Military career
Özdilek entered cadet school in 1916. He was promoted to Lieutenant the following year. Özdilek would later participate in the Turkish War of Independence, including in the Greco-Turkish War (1919-1922). He was promoted to General in 1959.

He was Commander of the First Army of Turkey (August 1958 to June 1960).

Political career
Özdilek became  Defense Minister, State Minister and Deputy Prime Minister in 1960 after the Turkish military organized the May 1960 Turkish coup d'état and overthrew the government of Adnan Menderes. The following year, he became acting Prime Minister during military control of Turkey after the previous Prime Minister, Cemal Gürsel, became President. He held the position until the government was once again under civilian control with İsmet İnönü as Prime Minister. Later, he served in the Senate of the Republic and the Grand National Assembly of Turkey.
In the first session of the 1983 parliament, he assumed the temporary leadership of the new parliament during the ceremonies and the election of the new parliament chairman.

References

1898 births
1989 deaths
20th-century prime ministers of Turkey
People from Bursa
Populist Party (Turkey) politicians
Prime Ministers of Turkey
Deputy Prime Ministers of Turkey
Ministers of National Defence of Turkey
Ministers of the Interior of Turkey
Members of the Senate of the Republic (Turkey)
Deputies of Konya
Turkish Army generals
Commanders of the First Army of Turkey
Turkish military personnel of the Greco-Turkish War (1919–1922)
Members of the 24th government of Turkey
Members of the 25th government of Turkey